The 2008 Sulawesi earthquake struck Sulawesi, Indonesia, on 16 November at 17:02:31 UTC. A 7.4  earthquake, it was followed by seven aftershocks higher than 5.0 . Tsunami warnings were issued for the region, but later cancelled. Four people were killed in the quake and 59 injured.

Effects 

The earthquake caused four fatalities and nearly 60 injuries. Over 700 houses were destroyed, and several buildings collapsed, one of which killed a man in the city of Gorontalo. The assessment of damage in rural areas with unreliable communication led officials to believe that the extent of the damage was greater than their initial evaluations.

See also
List of earthquakes in 2008
List of earthquakes in Indonesia

References

External links

2008 in Indonesia
2008 earthquakes
Earthquakes in Indonesia
History of Sulawesi
November 2008 events in Asia
2008 disasters in Indonesia